The Last of Mrs. Cheyney is a 1929 American Pre-Code comedy-drama film directed by Sidney Franklin. The screenplay by Hanns Kräly is based on the 1925 play of the same name by Frederick Lonsdale which ran on Broadway for 385 performances. The film was remade twice, with the same title in 1937 and as The Law and the Lady in 1951.

The film's sets were designed by the resident MGM art director Cedric Gibbons.

Plot
Resourceful and engaging Fay Cheyney, posing as a wealthy Australian widow at a Monte Carlo hotel, befriends Mrs. Webley with the intention of stealing her pearl necklace, a plot devised by Charles, her butler and partner-in-crime. Complicating the situation are the romantic feelings she develops for Lord Arthur Dilling, Mrs. Webley's nephew. While taking the necklace during a party in the Webley home, Fay is caught by Arthur, who threatens to expose her unless she submits to him. Rather than compromise her principles, she confesses to her hostess, who plans to contact the police until Lord Elton, another guest, recalls Fay has a love letter he wrote her that could prove to be embarrassing to everyone present. They offer her money in exchange for the letter and her freedom, but when she destroys the letter and refuses their payment, they welcome her back into their social circle.

Cast
Norma Shearer as Fay Cheyney 
Basil Rathbone as  Lord Arthur Dilling 
George Barraud as  Charles 
Herbert Bunston as  Lord Elton 
Hedda Hopper as Lady Maria
Maude Turner Gordon as Mrs. Webley
 Moon Carroll as Joan 
 Madeline Seymour as Mrs. Wynton 
 Cyril Chadwick as Willie Wynton 
 George K. Arthur as George 
 Frank Finch Smiles as William

Critical reception
Mordaunt Hall of The New York Times said, "It is a well-arranged picture, but nevertheless one in which it is not difficult to detect where Mr. Lonsdale left off and where the scenario writers tried their hand at dialogue . . . There are a number of interesting dramatic passages that are pictured with considerable cunning. The dialogue goes on for some time, and Sidney Franklin, the director, keeps his players busy, which is a relief after seeing talking screen images standing in the same spot until they have had their say."

Edwin Schallert of the Los Angeles Times observed, "In the portrayals, Miss Shearer averaged well. She evidences a more precise expressiveness facially than she does vocally, and some of her very best scenes are in the silent ones. Nevertheless, she measures very well to the majority of the role’s requirements, the crispness of her voice being well suited to the repartee portions. She is exceedingly attractive in the role."

Awards and honors
Screenwriter Hanns Kräly was nominated twice for the Academy Award for Best Writing at the 2nd Academy Awards, for this film and The Patriot, winning for the latter.

References

External links

Film poster

1929 films
1929 comedy-drama films
American comedy-drama films
American black-and-white films
American films based on plays
Films directed by Sidney Franklin
Films produced by Irving Thalberg
Films set in Monaco
Films set in London
1920s English-language films
Metro-Goldwyn-Mayer films
1920s American films